Damiano Carrara (born 22 September 1985) is an Italian chef, restaurateur and cookbook author who resides in Moorpark, California.

Early life
Carrara was born in Lucca, Tuscany. He served as a bartender at age 19 in his hometown before he continued bartending across Dublin, Ireland. By 2012, he and his brother Massimiliano had relocated to Moorpark, California, where they opened their bakery Carrara Pastries. In 2013, they opened a second location in Agoura Hills, California.

Career
Carrara has made television appearances on several Food Network series. He first came to prominence as a contestant in the premier season of Spring Baking Championship in 2015, where he finished in second place. Later that year, he went on to win the "Chocotage XXL" episode of Cutthroat Kitchen.

Carrara also infrequently served as a judge on Bakers vs. Fakers and Winner Cake All. Carrara also served as a judge in the Christmas Cookie Challenge, which aired on Food Network in 2017.

Food Network Star and Halloween Baking Championship

In May 2016, Carrara was announced as a contestant for the twelfth season of Food Network Star. He survived until midway through the season finale, finishing in third place. In October 2016, he served as one of the judges in the second season of Halloween Baking Championship.

Filmography

Television
 Spring Baking Championship - SECOND PLACE (6 episodes, 2015)
 Cuthroat Kitchen: Chocotage XXL - WINNER (2015) 
 Food Network Star Season 12 - THIRD PLACE (2016)
 Halloween Baking Championship Season 2 - JUDGE (2016)
 Christmas Cookie Challenge 2 - JUDGE (2016)
 Guy's Grocery Games - JUDGE (1 episode, 2017)
 Bakers vs. Fakers - JUDGE (2 episodes, 2017)
 Christmas Cookie Challenge - JUDGE (3 episodes, 2017)
 Cake Star: Pasticcerie in sfida Season 1-6 - HOST (2018-2022) with Katia Follesa
 Home & Family - SELF (4 episodes, 2017-2018)
 Bake Off Italia: Dolci in forno - JUDGE (43 episodes, 2017-2020)
 Chopped Sweets - JUDGE (1 episode, 2021)

Bibliography

References

External links
 

1985 births
Food Network chefs
Food Network Star contestants
Italian cookbook writers
Italian emigrants to the United States
Italian television chefs
Living people
Pastry chefs
Businesspeople from Lucca